This article contains a list of fossil-bearing stratigraphic units in the state of South Carolina, U.S.

Sites

See also

 Paleontology in South Carolina

References

 

South Carolina
Stratigraphic units
Stratigraphy of South Carolina
South Carolina geography-related lists
United States geology-related lists